The Kiamika reservoir is a freshwater body located in the Kiamika Reservoir Regional Park, in unorganized territory of Lac-Douaire, in Antoine-Labelle Regional County Municipality, in the region of Laurentides, in Quebec, in Canada.

The Kiamika reservoir extends over the territory of four municipalities: Chute-Saint-Philippe (southern part of the reservoir), Lac-des-Écorces, Lac-Saguay and Rivière-Rouge. The reservoir extents also over mainly in the townships of Brunet, but also Rochon and Turgeon for the southern part.

Geography 
This reservoir constitutes the third largest body of water in the region.

Then the current flows on  towards the southwest, bypassing the "Île de la Perdrix Blanche" (island of the White Perdrix) and the "Petite île de la Perdrix" (Small island of the Perdrix) by crossing the Kiamika Reservoir, until the mouth from the lake to the southwest.

Before the land was submerged, the Kiamika River had two lakes: Upper Kiamika and Lower Kiamika. In 1952, the MacLaren Company undertook construction work which was related to the objective of controlling the floods of the Lièvre and the Ottawa for hydroelectric power generation. The Kiamika dam and the two retaining dikes thus created this large reservoir, facilitating logging on the Kiamika River.

The two main islands in the reservoir are "Île de la Perdrix Blanche" ( and its summit ) and the "Petite île de la Perdrix" ( and its peak reached ).

The main bays of the reservoir are: Quatre Milles bay, Blueberry bay, Berthelette bay, des Écorces bay and Cutaway bay (to the south). In addition to the Kiamika River, the reservoir is supplied by:
 northwest side: Kilby Creek (coming from the northwest), Elbow Creek and Colinette Creek;
 east side: the outlet of Lac Kilby and Lac Patate; the Ruisseau aux Bluets-Ouest which drains the Lac aux Bluets; Ruby Creek which drains Ruby Lake;
 south-east side: the discharge of Lac Vert and Lac du Parsnip; the outlet of Lake Johnny;
 south side: the outlet of Lake Bélanger and the Loutre;
 west side: the outlet of Roman lake; the discharge of Daviault lakes; the Cornes stream which drains the Lac des Cornes, Lac Doré, Lac Vaillant, Lac Pérodeau, Lac David-Lord and Lac Adrien.

The main peaks around the reservoir reach:

Dams and dikes 

The Kiamika reservoir has a dam and three retaining dikes, for hydroelectric regulation:
 Kiamika dam, located in the municipality Chute-Saint-Philippe.
 Kiamika-2 dike, located in the municipality of Lac-Saguay. This dike is the property of Centre d'expertise hydrique du Québec (Center of hydric expertise of Quebec).
 Kiamika-5 dike, located in the municipality of Chute-Saint-Philippe. This dike is owned by the Centre d'expertise hydrique du Québec.

Toponymy 
The toponym "Kiamika" means "steep rock" in Algonquin. Formerly, one of the two lakes (before submersion) was designated “Grand lac Kiamika”; it is thus indicated on the 1891 map of the canton of Rochon.

See also 
 Kiamika, Quebec, a municipality
 Lac-Oscar, an unorganized territory
 Regional Park (Quebec)

Further reading

References

External links 
 Official site of the Kiamika Reservoir Regional Park

Antoine-Labelle Regional County Municipality
Reservoirs in Quebec